Holger Valdemar Hansson (26 January 1927 – 17 January 2014) was a football player and coach. He was born in Gothenburg, Sweden. During his club career, Hansson played for IFK Göteborg. He won the bronze medal at the 1952 Summer Olympics. He later trained a number of teams, including IK Brage, IFK Göteborg, GAIS in Sweden.

References

1927 births
2014 deaths
Swedish footballers
Sweden international footballers
Association football defenders
Allsvenskan players
IFK Göteborg players
Olympic footballers of Sweden
Footballers at the 1952 Summer Olympics
Olympic bronze medalists for Sweden
Swedish football managers
IFK Göteborg managers
GAIS managers
Olympic medalists in football
Medalists at the 1952 Summer Olympics
Footballers from Gothenburg